"Watch This" is an unreleased song by American rapper Lil Uzi Vert produced by Kado and Philadelphian producer Forza. It was initially previewed on an Instagram livestream on March 12, 2019, and thought to appear on their second studio album Eternal Atake. In November 2019, Lil Uzi Vert publicly accused Forza of selling their unreleased material, prompting Forza to be removed from producer collective Working on Dying and the song to remain unreleased.

The song, along with its music video, leaked online in its entirety on April 7, 2022. On August 15, 2022, American producer Arizonatears uploaded their remix of the song on SoundCloud. This version went viral on TikTok in the following months, resulting in the remix being released to streaming under the Atlantic Records subsidiary Sped Up Nightcore as a single on February 5, 2023, and charting in multiple countries.

Charts

References

2023 songs
2023 singles
Lil Uzi Vert songs
Songs written by Lil Uzi Vert
Atlantic Records singles
Unreleased songs